Time of No Reply is a 1987 compilation album featuring outtakes and alternative versions of songs by English folk singer Nick Drake. It was also included as the fourth disc of the 1987 version of the Nick Drake box set Fruit Tree.

Track listing
All songs written by Nick Drake, except "Been Smoking Too Long," by Robin Frederick.
 "Time of No Reply" – 2:52
 "I Was Made to Love Magic" – 3:08
 "Joey" – 3:04
 "Clothes of Sand" – 2:32
 "Man in a Shed" – 3:02
 "Mayfair" – 2:28
 "Fly" – 3:35
 "Thoughts of Mary Jane" – 3:42
 "Been Smoking Too Long" – 2:13
 "Strange Meeting II" – 3:32
 "Rider on the Wheel" – 2:30
 "Black Eyed Dog" – 3:20
 "Hanging on a Star" – 2:42
 "Voice from the Mountain" – 3:40

Notes
Tracks 1, 2, 3 & 4 are outtakes from the Five Leaves Left sessions (November & December 1968)
Tracks 5 & 6 pre-date the Five Leaves Left sessions (October 1968)
Tracks 7, 9 & 10 are home recordings from 1967-1969
Track 8 is an alternate take featuring Richard Thompson on guitar (December 1968)
Tracks 11, 12, 13 & 14 are the so-called "final four" recordings (February 1974)

Remaster 
The Island executive who compiled the Family Tree collection indicated plans to remaster Time of No Reply (which was not originally released on Island, but on Hannibal Records), with a different track listing. This became Made to Love Magic.

References 

Nick Drake compilation albums
Albums produced by Joe Boyd
1987 compilation albums
Compilation albums published posthumously
Hannibal Records albums